Trona, California may refer to:
 Trona, Inyo County, California, census-designated place
 Trona, San Bernardino County, California, unincorporated community